Peach is a mobile application-based social network created by Dom Hofmann. Peach is available as an Android and iOS application. It was introduced at the January 2016 Consumer Electronics Show in Las Vegas.

Peach has been compared to Ello, Path, and App.net.

Peach has "magic words," which were compared to Slack's similar slash shortcuts. These allow the user to access commonly used functions such as typing the letter "g" to send a GIF or "c" to bring up a calendar, similar to a command line interface.

Peach eschews the traditional news feed, hashtagging, and tagging common to social networks. The editor-in-chief of The Next Web described Peach as a hybrid of Twitter and Slack, while noting that some users of the social network were creating fake celebrity accounts. Bloomberg Business noted that when it was introduced, "[e]verything about Peach... seemed hip, down to the URL", but that by the end of the month it appeared that "interest in Peach softened".

References

External links 
 

American social networking websites
Internet properties established in 2016
Mobile social software
Image-sharing websites
Social information processing
IOS software
Android (operating system) software